Gyrocarpus americanus is a flowering plant in the Hernandiaceae family, with a wide pantropical distribution.  Its common names include the helicopter tree, propeller tree, whirly whirly tree, stinkwood or shitwood.

Description
Gyrocarpus americanus is a slender, deciduous tree with smooth, grey bark. The tree grows to about 12 m in height.

The leaves are spirally arranged, crowded near the ends of the branches, and grow up to 150 × 120 mm in size. They are ovate, often 3-lobed, dark green above, paler and greyer below, with velvety surfaces, 3-veined from the base.  The veins are yellowish.

The cream to yellowish-green flowers grow in compact heads and have an unpleasant smell.  The fruit is a woody nut with two long thin wings that help in wind dispersal.  The winged fruit and the smell of the flowers have given the tree its various common names.

Taxonomy

Subspecies
 G. a. africanus Kubitzki (Africa)
 G. a. americanus Jacq. (East Africa, India, Malesia, northern Australia, Melanesia, Polynesia, and South and Central America)
 G. a. glaber Kubitzki (Madagascar)

Several other subspecies have been described.  Kubitzki distinguished eight – three in Madagascar, one each in tropical West and East Africa, one in tropical Australia, and one in Malesia, with the eighth being the typical subspecies G. a. americanus originating in the Palaeotropics and reaching the Neotropics by trans-Pacific dispersal.  Most of these are rarely collected or are not recognised.  Moreover, the monophyly of G. americanus remains unclear; the African species G. angustifolius and G. hababensis may lie within it.

References

Inline citations

Sources referenced

External links

 
 

Hernandiaceae
Flora of Africa
Flora of Madagascar
Flora of India (region)
Flora of Malesia
Flora of Christmas Island
Flora of Western Australia
Flora of the Northern Territory
Flora of Queensland
Flora of South America
Pantropical flora